Maja Åskag (born 18 December 2002) is a Swedish athlete who specializes in the triple jump and long jump. She was the gold medallist in both events at the World U20 Championships in Nairobi 2021, as well as at the European U20 Championships in Tallinn the same year, having completed a jumps 'double double'.

Former handball player Tomas Svensson is her paternal uncle and his son football player Max Svensson is her cousin.

References

External links 
 
 Maja Åskag at European Athletics
 Maja Åskag at Friidrottsstatistik (in Swedish)

2002 births
Living people
Swedish female long jumpers
Swedish female triple jumpers
World Athletics U20 Championships winners
21st-century Swedish women